Cindy Brooks may refer to:

 Cindy Brooks (model) (born 1951), American model and actress
 Cindy Brooks (rower) (born 1965), American rower